Meistä On Maa Täysi is the second studio album of Finnish rock group Wasara. To promote the album, the single "Manan maille" was released on Valentine's Day 2005 as a digital download. In April the new album followed. It was the second of a two album deal with Firebox Records. The album was released on Roihu Record a subsidiary of Firebox. A video was made for the title track. Filmed in black and white, it is a dark tale of suicide and is available on the Firebox compilation Firebox Video Collection (2007).

The material on the album covers both aggressive and melodic tracks, with once again the theme of melancholy and despair. The lyrics (which are made by Antti Åström) are in Finnish. It continues the journey of Wasara with the same kind of deep feelings as the premier album.

Track listing

Personnel 
 Ipi Kiiskinen – accordion (tracks: 1, 10), bass guitar
 Harri Lempinen – drums
 Sami Tikkanen – guitar
 Tuomo Tolonen – guitar
 Antti Åström – vocals, guitars

Guest musicians
 Aaro Seppovaara – guitar (track: 4)

Production
 Tuomo Lehtonen – artwork
 Petri Majuri – mastering
 Wasara and Aaro Seppovaara – producer
 Aaro Seppovaara – mixing, programming, recording

2005 albums
Finnish-language albums
Firebox Records albums
Wasara albums